Events from the 10th century in, or regarding, Historic Serbia or Serbs.

Monarchs 

The following, of the Vlastimirović dynasty, ruled Serbia:
 Petar (892–917)
 Pavle (917–921)
 Zaharija (921–924)
 Časlav (927–960)

Events 
 914–917
 Byzantines sends envoys to Serbs and Magyars regarding an alliance against the Bulgarians.
 Prince Petar of Serbia annexes Bosnia and Pagania.
 Prince Petar comes into conflict with Michael of Zahumlje.
 Michael warns the Bulgarians about the Serbian-Byzantine alliance.
 917
 End of 20-year-peace between Serbia and Bulgaria;
 Prince Petar defends an attack by his cousin and Bulgarian ally Pavle.
 Prince Petar is captured by Bulgarian generals, sent to jail in Bulgaria, and dies within a year.
 Pavle becomes the Serbian Prince.
 920
 Prince Pavle defends an attack by his cousin and Byzantine ally Zaharija.
 Zaharija is handed over to Symeon of Bulgaria.
 Prince Pavle switches to Byzantine support.
 921–922
 Zaharija is dispatched with Bulgarian troops and there is no more mention of Pavle.
 Zaharija becomes the Serbian Prince.
 Zaharija reavows his loyalty to the Byzantine Empire.
 923
 Zaharija united several Slav tribes along the common border to revolt against Bulgaria. Symeon sent an insufficient number of troops to quell the rebels; several Bulgarian generals were killed, their heads and weapons were sent to Constantinople by Zaharija as gifts and signs of loyalty
 924
 Časlav is dispatched with Bulgarian troops, forcing Zaharija into exile in Croatia.
 Symeon summons the Serbian nobility, to pay homage to their new Prince, Časlav, but instead of instating him, Symeon takes them captive, annexing Serbia.
 925
 Michael of Zahumlje disappears from sources.
 893–927
 a church is built in Sočanica.
 927
 Croatian-Bulgar battle in eastern Bosnia
 927 or 933
 Časlav returns to Serbia.
 Časlav unites the tribes of Bosnia, Herzegovina, Old Serbia and Montenegro (incorporated Zeta, Pagania, Zahumlje, Travunia, Konavle, Bosnia and Rascia into Serbia, ι Σερβλια).
 before 960
 The Magyars invade Bosnia.
 Časlav and his army defeats the Magyars. Kisa, the Magyar Duke, is killed by Tihomir. (see Battle of Drina)
 Tihomir receives the Drina župania and marries the daughter of Časlav.
 after 960
 Kisa's widow returns with an army. Časlav is captured and killed.
 Tihomir becomes the Serbian Prince.
 961–962
 Saqaliba (Slavs) in the mountainous regions of Central Balkans, "west of the Bulgarians and east from the other Slavs (Croats)", have the reputation of being "the most courageous and violent".
 968–971
 Sviatoslav's invasion of Bulgaria
 969–971
 Serbia is conquered by the Byzantines.
 971–976
 The Catepanate of Ras is established. "John" was the protospatharios and katepano of Ras.
 ca. 990
 Jovan Vladimir is born.
 992
 A Serbian diplomatic mission, possibly sent from Duklja, arrives in the Byzantine capital of Constantinople and was recorded in a charter of the Great Lavra Monastery, written in 993.
 998
 Rascia and Bosnia is annexed by Bulgaria.
 early 10th century
 Čučimir, of the Belojević noble family, holds Travunia.
 968–1018
 Byzantine conquest of Bulgaria
 10th- or 11th century
 "Peter" was the archon of Duklja.
 Emperor Basil II (976–1025) installed a garrison in Belgrade.

References 

 
10th century by country
Centuries in Serbia